The Celtic Interconnector is a planned 700MW high-voltage direct current (HVDC) submarine power cable between the southern coast of Ireland and the north-west coast of France.

If completed as planned, it will be the first such interconnector between the two countries.

The director general of EirGrid stated in 2022 that the interconnector was arguably "the most important Irish infrastructure project for this decade".

Route

The cable is due to run between the Knockraha substation in County Cork to the La Martyre substation in Finistère. 

Status
On 14 Sept 2022, the UK Marine Management Organisation granted a licence for the project to proceed. This was the last major license required before Step 6 construction could start in late 2022.

Project step six, construction and energisation, is scheduled to take place from 2022 to 2026. As of November 2022, the interconnector was "due to be completed and operational by 2026".

Technical specification
The electrical interconnector, which will be the first between the two countries, had an initial expected cost of €1billion and a planned capacity of 700MW.

The project also includes plans for a direct fibre optic communications link between Ireland and France.

Project promoters
The project is a joint venture between the Irish transmission system operator (TSO) EirGrid and French TSO Réseau de Transport d'Électricité (RTE) for the purpose of improving security of supply, reducing consumer electricity costs and supporting the development of renewable energy.

Project economics
, the interconnector was expected to cost €1.6billion.
According to the then Taoiseach, Micheál Martin, "The Celtic Interconnector will bring tangible benefits to the citizens of both France and Ireland by promoting the use of renewable energy, bringing down electricity prices, and helping ensure security of energy supply".

Project history
In July 2016, after completion of a feasibility study the two countries agreed to proceed with a two-year planning phase. 
This included an economic assessment, environmental considerations and will determine the placement of the cable and onshore stations, while a decision initially due on the project is foreseen for 2020 or 2021. In May 2018, the project was granted a foreshore license to begin marine surveys for the potential landing sites at Ballinwilling, Claycastle and Redbarn beaches, County Cork.

In 2018, the project was given preliminary approval for European Investment Bank funding as part of preparations by Ireland for Brexit, for €530million.

By 2019, the project had been designated a European Project of Common Interest as part of the European Super Grid.

Three potential landing sites on the Cork coast were identified and six locations (Ballyadam, Leamlara, Knockraha, Pigeon Hill, Kilquane and Ballyvatta) were under consideration for the HVDC converter station.

By 2019, due to the potential impact of Brexit on electricity trading over the existing Ireland  UK HVDC interconnectors, planning for the Celtic Interconnector had accelerated.

In December 2020, EirGrid and RTE signed a €520million European Commission funding agreement for the Celtic Interconnector.

As of 2021, the cable was expected to be operational by 2026. In August 2021, the project was at step five in the planning process and was expected to continue until 2022.

In May 2022, An Bord Pleanala granted permission for the onshore portion of the project while in August 2022, the Department for Housing Local Government and Heritage granted the project a foreshore licence, an important permit for the undersea work involved.

In November 2022, final construction and finance agreements were signed off by the Irish and French governments at the Irish embassy in Paris.

See also

 Energy in Ireland
 Energy in France
 Electricity sector in Ireland
 Electricity sector in France
 Greenlink, cable project to connect Ireland and the United Kingdom
 NordLink, cable project to connect Norway and Germany
 NorGer, cable project to connect Norway and Germany
 NorNed, cable project to connect Norway and Netherlands

References

External links

Map with power line and tentative substation locations
Poste Electrique De La Martyre, Unnamed Road, 29800 La Martyre, France (map)
RTE video clip

Electrical interconnectors to and from the island of Ireland
Electrical interconnectors to and from the Synchronous Grid of Continental Europe
HVDC transmission lines
Proposed electric power infrastructure in the Republic of Ireland
Proposed electric power infrastructure in France
Proposed electric power transmission systems